Chickasaw County is the name of two counties in the United States:

 Chickasaw County, Iowa 
 Chickasaw County, Mississippi